Vittoria Marisa Schiaparelli Berenson (born February 15, 1947) is an American actress and model. She appeared on the front covers of Vogue and Time, and won the National Board of Review Award for Best Supporting Actress for her role as Natalia Landauer in the 1972 film Cabaret. The role also earned her Golden Globe and BAFTA Award nominations. Her other film appearances include Death in Venice (1971), Barry Lyndon (1975), S.O.B. (1981) and I Am Love (2009).

In 2001, she made her Broadway debut in the revival of Design for Living.

Early life

Childhood
Berenson was born in New York City, the elder of two daughters. Her father, Robert Lawrence Berenson, was an American career diplomat turned shipping executive of Lithuanian Jewish descent, and his family's original surname was Valvrojenski. Her mother was Maria-Luisa Yvonne "Gogo" Radha de Wendt Schiaparelli, a socialite of Italian, Swiss, French, and Egyptian ancestry.

Family
Berenson's maternal grandmother was the fashion designer Elsa Schiaparelli, and her maternal grandfather was Wilhelm de Wendt de Kerlor, a theosophist and psychic medium. Her younger sister, Berinthia, became a model, actress, and photographer as Berry Berenson.

She is also a great-grandniece of Giovanni Schiaparelli, an Italian astronomer who was the first to describe the canals of Mars, and a second cousin, once removed, of art expert Bernard Berenson and his sister Senda Berenson, an athlete and educator who was one of the first two women elected to the Basketball Hall of Fame.

Career

A fashion model discovered as a teenager by Vogue editor Diana Vreeland, Berenson came to prominence in the 1960s ("I once was one of the highest paid models in the world", she told The New York Times). She appeared on the cover of the July 1970 issue of Vogue as well as the cover of Time on December 15, 1975. She appeared in numerous fashion layouts in Vogue in the late 1960s and early 1970s. She was known as "The Queen of the Scene" for her frequent appearances at nightclubs and other social venues in her youth, and Yves Saint Laurent dubbed her "the girl of the Seventies".

Berenson's early film roles included Gustav von Aschenbach's wife in Luchino Visconti's 1971 film Death in Venice and the Jewish department store heiress Natalia Landauer in the 1972 film Cabaret. The latter role led to two Golden Globe nominations, a BAFTA nomination and an award from the National Board of Review. She also portrayed tragic beauty Lady Lyndon in the Stanley Kubrick film Barry Lyndon (1975). Vincent Canby of The New York Times wrote: "Marisa Berenson splendidly suits her costumes and wigs." She recalled her experience working under Kubrick's direction:

Berenson's other performances included Casanova & Co. (1977), Killer Fish (1979), the Blake Edwards comedy S.O.B. (1981), The Secret Diary of Sigmund Freud (1984) and Clint Eastwood's White Hunter Black Heart (1990), as well as in made-for-TV movies in the United States, such as the Holocaust-themed drama Playing for Time (1980). She guest-starred an episode of The Muppet Show during its third season in 1978. She made her Broadway debut in the 2001 revival of Design for Living, which also starred Jennifer Ehle, Alan Cumming and Dominic West. In 2009, she appeared in the film I Am Love.

In August 2016 she appeared in a production of Romeo and Juliet at the Garrick Theatre in London, as Lady Capulet.

Berenson is chairman of the board of Culture Project, an organization that sponsors the theater.

Personal life
On September 11, 2001, her younger sister and sole sibling, Berry Perkins, widow of actor Anthony Perkins, was killed in the first flight to hit the World Trade Center.  Marisa was also in an airplane during the terrorist attacks, flying from Paris to New York. In an interview with CBS, she told of the experience and how hours later she landed in Newfoundland (flights were diverted to Canada), and was told of her sister's death by a phone call with her daughter. Said Berenson: "I have hope and tremendous faith. I think that's what gets you through life ... through tragedies is when you have faith."

Of her practice of Transcendental Meditation she said:
India changed my life, because I was searching for my spiritual path, and I ended up in an ashram in Rishikesh with Maharishi and the Beatles. We'd sit on the floor at night, and George and Ringo would play the guitar, and we'd meditate all day, and have meals together, and become vegetarians, and live in huts. But it was just normal. It wasn't like, "Oh, here are the Beatles." The most important thing was my transcendental meditation.

Berenson lives in a villa on the outskirts of Marrakesh. She is fluent in English, Italian, and French.

Relationships
Berenson's first husband was James Randall, a rivet manufacturer; they wed in Beverly Hills in 1976 and divorced in 1978. The couple have one daughter, Starlite Melody Randall (born 1977) who is a social worker.

Her second husband was Aaron Richard Golub, a lawyer, whom she married in 1982 and divorced in 1987. During the divorce proceedings, the judge ruled "the increased value of Ms. Berenson's acting and modeling career during the marriage were marital property" and therefore subject to consideration in any settlement agreements.

Filmography

Film

Television

Theatre

References

External links

 
 

1947 births
Actresses from New York City
American film actresses
American people of Egyptian descent
American people of French descent
American people of Italian descent
American people of Lithuanian-Jewish descent
American people of Swiss descent
Female models from New York (state)
Living people
People educated at Heathfield School, Ascot
21st-century American women